William Franklin Draper (April 9, 1842 – January 28, 1910) was an American businessman, industrialist, and soldier who served as a U.S. Representative from Massachusetts.

Biography

Draper was born in Lowell, Massachusetts on April 9, 1842, and was a descendant of early Massachusetts settler James Draper. Draper attended public, private, and high schools, he studied mechanical engineering and cotton manufacturing.

During the American Civil War Draper enlisted as a private in the Twenty-fifth Regiment, Massachusetts Volunteer Infantry, on September 9, 1861. He was soon elected Second Lieutenant of his company and was promoted rapidly to lieutenant colonel. After his discharge Draper was awarded the brevet grades of colonel and brigadier general of Volunteers.

After the war he joined his family's textile machine manufacturing business at Hopedale, Massachusetts, and patented many improvements. He also served as delegate to the Republican National Convention in 1876. He went on to serve as colonel on the staff of Governor John Davis Long from 1880 to 1883.

Draper was elected as a Republican to the Fifty-third and Fifty-fourth Congresses (March 4, 1893 – March 3, 1897). Draper served as chairman of the Committee on Patents (Fifty-fourth Congress), however he was not a candidate for renomination in 1896. He later served as president of the Draper Co. upon its incorporation in 1896. Later he was the Ambassador and Minister Plenipotentiary to Italy 1897–1899.

Draper was married twice: to Lydia Joy from 1862 until her death in 1884, and to Susan Preston, daughter of General William Preston of Kentucky, who survived him. His second marriage may be the only one in which a Union general married the daughter of a Confederate general. Their daughter Margaret Preston Draper married Italian aristocrat Prince Andrea Boncompagni-Ludovisi.

He died in Washington, D.C., on January 28, 1910, he was interred in Village Cemetery, Hopedale, Massachusetts.

See also

List of Massachusetts generals in the American Civil War
Massachusetts in the American Civil War

References

External links
 Men of Mark in America Biography & Portrait

 

1842 births
1910 deaths
People from Hopedale, Massachusetts
People of Massachusetts in the American Civil War
1876 United States presidential election
Union Army generals
19th-century American diplomats
Republican Party members of the United States House of Representatives from Massachusetts
Politicians from Lowell, Massachusetts
19th-century American politicians